Dale Walz (born September 16, 1964) was an American politician and police officer.

Walz lived in Brainerd, Minnesota and received his associate degree in criminal justice from Central Lakes College. He served in the Baxter, Minnesota police department. Walz served in the Minnesota House of Representatives from 2001 to 2004 and was a Republican.

References

1964 births
Living people
People from Brainerd, Minnesota
American police officers
Republican Party members of the Minnesota House of Representatives